Dark Night (also known as Layla Affel) is an Israeli short film directed by Leonid Prudovsky.

Title
The title refers to the song that in the dark night ride one of the Israeli soldiers is whistling. It is a tune of Russian war song Тёмная ночь (lit. Dark Night).

Plot
In the dark night two young Israeli soldiers are on their ride control. When their car runs on explosive and Palestinian fighters are seeking for them. The soldiers hide into a house of a Palestinian couple and take house owner as hostages.

Crew 

 Writer/director: Leonid Prudovsky;
 Producer: Rafael Katz
 Executive Producer: Herzl Maar
 Photographer: Yisrael Friedman
 Editor: Evgeny Ruman.

The film stars: Eran Amichai, Johnny Arbid, Hanan Savyon, Pini Tavger, and Helena Yaralova.

Awards and festivals

Awards
2005: nomination for Student Academy Award;
2005: special mention, best short film at 62nd Venice International Film Festival (Venice, Italy);
2005: best film award by Cittadella del Corto (Rome, Italy);
2005: Television Drama Award - Honorable Mention at Jerusalem Film Festival (Jerusalem, Israel);
2007: Silver Warsaw Phoenix in short film category at 4th Jewish Motifs International Film Festival (Warsaw, Poland).

Festivals (official selection)
2005: 62nd Venice International Film Festival (Venice, Italy);
2005: Cittadella del Corto (Rome, Italy);
2005: Jerusalem Film Festival (Jerusalem, Israel);
2006: Palm Springs International Shortfest;
2007: 4th Jewish Motifs International Film Festival (Warsaw, Poland);

References

External links

Israeli short films
2005 short films
2005 films
Films directed by Leonid Prudovsky